The long-finned sand diver (Limnichthys polyactis) or tommyfish, is a species of sandburrower endemic to the coastal waters around the North Island of New Zealand to depths of about , on sandy or gravelly bottoms.  It can reach a length of  TL.

References

long-finned sand diver
Endemic marine fish of New Zealand
Fish of the North Island
Taxa named by Joseph S. Nelson
long-finned sand diver